Yanomamua is a genus of flowering plants belonging to the family Gentianaceae.

Its native range is Northern Brazil.

Species:
 Yanomamua araca J.R.Grant, Maas & Struwe

References

Gentianaceae
Gentianaceae genera